Jananam is a 2004 Tamil language action drama film directed by Ramesh Selvan. The film stars Arun Vijay and Priyanka Trivedi in lead roles, while Ashish Vidyarthi, Raghuvaran, Charle, Vadivelu and Nassar play supporting roles. The music was composed by Bharadwaj. The film was launched in 2002, but got delayed and was released in 2004.

Plot
Surya (Arunkumar) is an angry young man who is a post-graduate student looking for a job. His girlfriend is Shruthi (Priyanka Trivedi). She always tries to control his rage as he fights against injustice in society. Once, Surya fights for a friend, Ganesh (Charle), who is a gold medalist but does not get a job as he is not able to get a loan from a bank because he does not have any collateral to pledge. Another gold medalist friend dies in an accident after running helter-skelter hunting for a job. All this changes Surya’s life, especially after he meets a well-known writer and intellectual Udaya Murthy (Raghuvaran), who urges him, along with others, to start a movement against corruption and injustice in society. They start an Unemployed Graduate Association which rubs the local politician and don Muthukaruppan (Ashish Vidyarthi) the wrong way. The idealist Surya turns into a raging force after Murthy is shot dead by police and he is jailed. In jail, he is brutally tortured by the police as he becomes a rallying point for the youths who are fighting unemployment.

Cast

Production
The film was announced in 2002 with Arun Kumar and Priyanka Trivedi playing lead roles. The film got delayed by a year due to financing problems; also Priyanka's marriage caused the delay and it was finally released in 2004.

Soundtrack
The soundtrack was composed by Bharadwaj, with lyrics written by Vairamuthu, P. Vijay, Snehan and Yugabharathi.

Reviews
Indiaglitz wrote: "Though director Ramesh has tried to narrate an issue that the society is grappling with, it's certain that the delayed release will have an impact in the minds of the audience". Hindu wrote: "DESPITE A rather irrelevant and unrealistic theme that offers little support to the story and cast, if Crescent Movie International's "Jananam" is able to garner appreciation, much of the credit goes to the film's hero, Arun Kumar. The actor has slogged it out and the diligence shows. Be it action, emotion or subdued expression, Arun Kumar comes out with a commendable show in every frame. Sify wrote:" The story, plot development and packaging is old wine in a new bottle and has a hangover of films like Sethu and Nanda . Still it is watchable and has a positive message that unemployed youth can change the way of the society and administration, provided they are focused". Balaji b wrote: "Jananam belongs to the list of movies that is well-intentioned but not particularly well-made, the issue and its solution are presented in a screenplay that does not do justice to them" while another critic wrote: "The film begins with violence and finds the solution in peace talks. The story is weak and so is the screen play. The director focuses more on his punch dialogues and student revolution rather than building a story with flowing scenes to stimulate interest. Chennaionline wrote: "Director Ramesh may not have been able to convey all that he wanted to, nor in the exact way he had wanted to. But he should be commended for taking up a film with a message, and for his sincerity in depicting the plight of the educated unemployed from the poorer strata of society".

References

2004 films
Unemployment in fiction
2000s Tamil-language films
Films scored by Bharadwaj (composer)
Films directed by Ramesh Selvan